Jan Augustini Degelenkamp (1725, Groningen – 1773, Haarlem), was an 18th-century painter from the Northern Netherlands.

Biography
According to the RKD he was a landscape painter who made large wall decorations, many of which are still installed in the buildings for which they were designed. He was a pupil of Philip van Dijk in the Hague. He started his career working on pictures of flora for botanists, and contributed to the herbarium of the Leiden hortulanus Jacobus Schuurmans Stekhoven. His pupils were his son Jacobus Luberti Augustini, Egbert van Drielst, Hermanus Numan, Gabriël van Rooyen, and Hendrik Tavenier.

References

Jan Augustini on Artnet

1725 births
1773 deaths
18th-century Dutch painters
18th-century Dutch male artists
Dutch male painters
Painters from Groningen